RULE (Run Up-to-Date Linux Everywhere) is a project that aims to use up-to-date Linux software on old PCs (5 years old or more), by recompiling and changing some code to recent programs in order to make them use less resources so they can run conveniently.

The reasons 
The principal advantages of using old PCs with up to date software are:

support for more up-to-date standards (HTML4, Java, etc.)
more secure to use because of patched security holes
old PCs may consume less energy than new ones, making them cheaper to use and reducing pollution
re-use PCs that would otherwise be discarded, thus reducing e-waste
PCs are not cheap, especially for third world or Eastern European countries, or for big volumes (for example a school needs a lot of PCs.)

Information about the project 
The distributions of Linux that have been the focus for the project are Fedora Core and Red Hat, but users/developers of other distributions are welcomed.
The main activity of the RULE site is to test contributors' packages and provide user documentation and easy installation procedures.

See also 
Lightweight Linux distribution
Linux Terminal Server Project (a very different approach to the same problem)

External links 
Official website No longer in service
A Tribute to the RULE Project
SLINKY, the installer

Linux package management-related software
Free software projects